The 1973 Volvo International was a men's tennis tournament played on outdoor clay courts at the Mount Washington Hotel in Bretton Woods, New Hampshire in the United States. The event was part of the 1973 Commercial Union Assurance Grand Prix circuit and classified as C category. The tournament was held from July 23 through July 29, 1973. Eighth-seeded Vijay Amritraj won the singles title.

Finals

Singles

 Vijay Amritraj defeated  Jimmy Connors 7–5, 2–6, 7–5
 It was Amritraj's 1st title of the year and the 1st of his career.

Doubles
 Rod Laver /  Fred Stolle defeated  Bob Carmichael /  Frew McMillan 2–6, 6–3, 6–4
 It was Laver's 10th title of the year and the 47th of his professional career. It was Stolle's 3rd title of the year and the 12th of his professional career.

References

External links
 1973 Volvo International draw

Volvo International
Volvo International
Volvo International
Volvo International
Volvo International